Georges Burdeau (1905-1988) was a French constitutionalist.

References

French legal scholars
1905 births
1988 deaths